Perren Earle Baker (August 10, 1877 – February 13, 1974) was a Canadian politician who served as Alberta's Minister of Education from 1921 until 1935.

Electoral record

References

1877 births
1974 deaths
Canadian farmers
McMaster University alumni
People from Chatham-Kent
University of Chicago alumni
United Farmers of Alberta MLAs
Members of the Executive Council of Alberta